Beauly railway station is a railway station in the village of Beauly, in the Highland council area of Scotland. ScotRail, who manage the station, operate all services.

History

Original station 
It had two platforms, a passing loop and a goods shed with sidings that was equipped with a 1½-ton crane. The station was host to a LMS caravan from 1936 to 1939.

This was due to increasing competition from motorbuses, particularly those of Highland Omnibuses Ltd.

The original station building, located on the opposite side from the reopened platform, remains closed to the public; it is now used for offices and housing.

2002 reopening 

Following a local campaign, the station was reopened in 2002. A new single platform, shelter and car park were built in a £250,000 project. As a result, there is only one train door in operation at the station; announcements are made on the train as to which door this will be.

Plans to reopen nearby Conon Bridge railway station in a similar style were fulfilled on 8 February 2013.

Facilities 
There is a small car park at the station, in which there are cycle racks and lockers. On the platform, there is a modern waiting shelter, in which there is a payphone. As there are no facilities to purchase tickets, passengers must buy one in advance, or from the guard on the train.

Passenger volume 
The reopening of the station led to 75% of local commuters switching from road to rail. Beauly has therefore provided a boost to campaigns to open small basic local stations. In 2007/8, with its population of just 1,164, Beauly's usage-to-population ratio (36 annual journeys per head) ranked as one of the highest in Britain.

The statistics cover twelve month periods that start in April.

Services 
As of the December 2021 timetable, on weekdays and Saturdays, the station sees 11 trains northbound (3 to Wick via Thurso, 4 to Kyle of Lochalsh, 1 to Dingwall, 1 to Invergordon, 1 to Ardgay and 1 to Tain), and 13 trains southbound to Inverness. On Sundays, the station sees 6 trains northbound (1 to Wick, 1 to Kyle of Lochalsh, 1 to Invergordon and 3 to Tain), and 6 trains southbound.

References

External links 

Inverness and Ross-shire Railway - RailScot
Beauly Station on navigable 1947 O.S. map

Railway stations in Highland (council area)
Former Highland Railway stations
Railway stations in Great Britain opened in 1862
Railway stations in Great Britain closed in 1960
Railway stations in Great Britain opened in 2002
Reopened railway stations in Great Britain
Railway stations served by ScotRail
Railway stations opened by Network Rail
2002 establishments in Scotland
1862 establishments in Scotland